Margaret of Bavaria (1321–1374) was the eldest child of Louis IV, Holy Roman Emperor, and Margaret II, Countess of Hainaut.

In Ofen in 1351, Margaret married Stephen, Duke of Slavonia, the youngest son of King Charles I of Hungary and Elizabeth of Poland. The couple's first child, Elizabeth, was born the next year, and was followed by John in 1354. Upon Stephen's death the same year, John inherited the duchy, with Duchess Margaret as his guardian.

The Duchess remarried in 1356, choosing Gerlach von Hohenlohe as her second husband, but kept the regency over Slavonia, Croatia and Dalmatia. However, a war broke out between the Kingdom of Hungary and the Republic of Venice in the spring of the same year and the royal court decided to end the duchy's autonomy. Margaret was thus deprived of power. John, who had been recognised as heir presumptive of both Hungary and Poland, died in 1360.

She died in 1374 and was survived by her daughter and second husband.

References

Bibliography

House of Wittelsbach
14th-century women rulers
Women of medieval Bavaria
1325 births
1374 deaths
House of Anjou-Hungary
14th-century German women
14th-century German nobility
Duchesses of Slavonia
Burials at Munich Frauenkirche
Children of Louis IV, Holy Roman Emperor
Daughters of kings